Turkish Sign Language is the language used by the deaf community in Turkey. As with other sign languages, TİD has a unique grammar that is different from the oral languages used in the region.

TİD uses a two-handed manual alphabet which is very different from the two-handed alphabets used in the BANZSL sign languages it also uses the tongue in certain phrases.

Grammar
There is little published information on Turkish Sign Language. Turkish Sign Language exhibits an subject-object-verb order (SOV). There is a rich set of modal verbs which appear in a clause-final position.

Signing communities
According to the Turkish Statistical Institute, there are a total of 89,000 persons (54,000 male, 35,000 female) with hearing impairment and 55,000 persons (35,000 male, 21,000 female) with speaking disability living in Turkey, based on 2000 census data.

History
TİD is dissimilar from European sign languages. There was a court sign language of the Ottoman Empire, which reached its height in the 16th century and 17th centuries and lasted at least until the early 20th. However, there is no record of the signs themselves and no evidence the language was ancestral to modern Turkish Sign Language.

Deaf schools were established in 1902, and until 1953 used TİD alongside the Turkish spoken and written language in education. Since 1953 Turkey has adopted an oralist approach to deaf education.

See also
Sign language
Deafness

References

External links
Turkish Sign Language (Turkish and English) Website including dictionary and general information, by the Turkish Academy of Sciences and Koç University
Turkish National Deaf Federation homepage (Turkish and English).

Sign languages
Sign language isolates
Languages of Turkey
Disability in Turkey
Sign languages of Turkey